Yellow Creek Township is one of the eighteen townships of Columbiana County, Ohio, United States. As of the 2010 census the population was 2,140.

Geography
Located in the southeastern part of the county along the Ohio River, it borders the following townships:
Madison Township - north
Liverpool Township - northeast
Hancock County, West Virginia - southeast, across the Ohio River
Saline Township, Jefferson County - south
Brush Creek Township, Jefferson County - southwest
Washington Township - west

It is the most southerly township in Columbiana County.

One village is located in Yellow Creek Township:
The village of Wellsville, in the southeast

Name and history

It is the only Yellow Creek Township statewide.

The township was organized in 1806.

Government
The township is governed by a three-member board of trustees, who are elected in November of odd-numbered years to a four-year term beginning on the following January 1. Two are elected in the year after the presidential election and one is elected in the year before it. There is also an elected township fiscal officer, who serves a four-year term beginning on April 1 of the year after the election, which is held in November of the year before the presidential election. Vacancies in the fiscal officership or on the board of trustees are filled by the remaining trustees.

Township Trustees
Noah C. Allison, Chairman
Mark Allison, Vice Chairman
Kenny Biacco

Fiscal Officer
Deborah A. Lyle

References

External links
County website

Townships in Columbiana County, Ohio
Townships in Ohio
1806 establishments in Ohio